The 2011 POC-PSC National Games was held at the cities of Bacolod, Bago, Silay and Talisay - Negros Occidental from May 22–29, 2011.

The Philippine National Games shall become a yearly national championships for all sports - to assess the expanse of athletic potentials as by-product of your national programs, to serve as the ultimate challenge grounds to bring out the best of the national crop and the emerging ones, and finally, to serve as the final "ranking and selection ground" for possible composition of the national pool, and from which the team for the future international competitions (e.g. SEA Games, Asian Games, Olympics, Etc. ... )

Venues

Bacolod
Fun run – 10K/5K/3K – Bacolod City New Government Center
Athletics – Panaad Track Oval
Badminton – Pohang Badminton Court
Beach volleyball – St. La Salle University
Billiards – Gaisano Mall
Fencing – UNO-R Gym
Gymnastics – St. John Institute/San Agustin College Gymnasium
Judo – Riverside College
Karatedo – Bacolod Arts Center/Bacolod City National High School
Lawn tennis – Center Court Tennis Club/Noah's Haven
Motorcycle sport – Bacolod City Airport Runway
Sailing – Lopue Family Beach Resort
Softball – Bacolod City National High School
Soft tennis – UNO-R Gymnasium
Swimming – Panaad Swimming Pool
Taekwondo – Negros Occidental Multipurpose Activity Center
Volleyball – St. La Salle University Covered Court
Weightlifting – SM North Terminal
Windsurfing – Lopue Family Beach Resort
Wrestling – Bacolod Arts Center-Bacolod Nat’l High School

Bago
Canoe-Kayak – Bantayan Park
Dragon boat – Bantayan Park
Muay Thai – Manuel Torres Coliseum and Cultural Center
Wushu – Negros Ocidental Multipurpose Activity Center

Talisay
Cycling (Road Race) – Murcia Town
Futsal – Talisay City Gymnasium
Women's football– Carlos Hilado State College Football Field
Pencak silat – Talisay Public Plaza
Table tennis – Carlos Hilado State College Coliseum
Wall climb – Bago City Rock Climbing Gym

Silay
Archery – Doña Monserrat Lopez High School Football Field
Arnis – City Plaza
Sepak takraw – Natalio Velez Multi-Purpose Gym
Triathlon – Marina Pacific Shore

Sports

Archery
Arnis
Athletics
Badminton
Baseball
Beach volleyball
Billiards
Canoeing /Kayaking
Cycling
Dragon boat
Fencing
Football
Futsal
Gymnastics
Judo
Karatedo
Lawn tennis
Motorcycle sport
Muay Thai
Pencak silat
Sailing
Sepak takraw
Soft tennis
Softball
Swimming
Table tennis
Taekwondo
Triathlon
Volleyball
Wall climbing
Weightlifting
Windsurfing
Wrestling
Wushu

Calendar

Sponsors
 Smart
 P&G
 Scratch It! Instant Tama
 Summit
 Accel
 Zest Air
 Gatorade
 Negros Navigation
 Standard Insurance Co., Inc.
 Bodivance
 Philippine Daily Inquirer
 SuperFerry
 ABS-CBN
 The Philippine Star
 Province of Negros Occidental
 City of Bago
 City of Bacolod
 City of Silay
 City of Talisay

External links
Official Website: http://www.png.psc.gov.ph/

Official Result: https://web.archive.org/web/20120326080441/http://www.png.psc.gov.ph/component/content/article/81/251-png-medalist-as-of-may-26-2011.html

Multi-sport events in the Philippines
2011 in Philippine sport
Sports in Negros Occidental
Philippine National Games
May 2011 sports events in the Philippines